Big Sur Station is a multiagency visitor center and ranger station operated by Caltrans, the Los Padres National Forest, and California State Parks. It is approximately 26 miles south of Carmel, California near Big Sur, California.

It serves as the western terminus of the 23 mile Pine Ridge Trail.

Services
Trailhead
Visitor Center - open 9:30 AM to 4:30 PM  831.667.2315
Restrooms
Overnight Parking ($5/day)

Buildings and structures in Monterey County, California
Monterey Ranger District, Los Padres National Forest
Tourist attractions in Monterey County, California
Big Sur